Lundøya is an island in Steigen Municipality in Nordland county, Norway. The island lies at the entrance to the Sagfjorden between the island of Engeløya in Steigen and the village of Skutvika on the mainland in Hamarøy Municipality. Lundøya is now uninhabited, but has previously had settlements on it until the 1970s.

See also
List of islands of Norway

References

Steigen
Islands of Nordland
Uninhabited islands of Norway